The 162nd Division was created in November 1948 under the Regulation of the Redesignations of All Organizations and Units of the Army, issued by Central Military Commission on November 1, 1948, basing on the 13th Independent Division of Northeastern People's Liberation Army,  formed in September.

The division was part of 49th Corps. Under the flag of 162nd division it took part in the Chinese civil war. In October 1949 the division was disbanded.

As of disbandment the division was composed of:
484th Regiment;
485th Regiment;
486th Regiment.

References

中国人民解放军各步兵师沿革，http://blog.sina.com.cn/s/blog_a3f74a990101cp1q.html

Infantry divisions of the People's Liberation Army
Military units and formations established in 1948
Military units and formations disestablished in 1949